Indirect elections were held for the presidency and vice-presidency of the government of the Republic of China on Taiwan on March 21, 1984. The vote took place at the Chung-Shan Building in Yangmingshan, Taipei.  Incumbent President Chiang Ching-kuo was re-elected for the second term with Governor of Taiwan Province Lee Teng-hui as the Vice President.

Incumbent Vice-president Hsieh Tung-min decided not to seek for his second term due to old age. The then Governor of Taiwan Province Lee Teng-hui, also a Taiwan-born Kuomintang member, was picked Chiang's running-mate. Chiang died in office on January 13, 1988. Vice President Lee Teng-hui then sworn in as the President.

Electors

The election was conducted by the National Assembly in its meeting place Chung-Shan Building in Yangmingshan, Taipei. According to the Temporary Provisions against the Communist Rebellion, National Assembly delegates elected in the following elections were eligible to vote:
 1947 Chinese National Assembly election,
 1969 Taiwanese legislative election, and
 1980 Taiwanese legislative election.
In total, there were 1,036 delegates reported to the secretariat to attend this seventh session of the first National Assembly.

Vote summary

Presidential election

Vice-presidential election

See also
 History of Republic of China
 President of the Republic of China
 Vice President of the Republic of China

References

1984
1984 in Taiwan
1984 elections in Asia